Mayger is an unincorporated community in Columbia County, Oregon, United States. Fishing is important to Mayger. It was originally the site of Frenchman Charles Mayger's Mayger Logging Company, which he sold in 1886 to William F. Slaughter. Mayger's post office was established three years later and its first postmaster was Charles Mayger. It closed in 1961. Mayger is served by the Clatskanie, Oregon post office.

References

Unincorporated communities in Columbia County, Oregon
1889 establishments in Oregon
Populated places established in 1889
Oregon populated places on the Columbia River
Unincorporated communities in Oregon